Victor Stephen Gilliam (July 21, 1953June 17, 2020) was an American politician and actor who served as a member of the Oregon House of Representatives from 2007 to 2017. A member of the Republican Party, Gilliam resigned in 2017 due to health problems.

After serving as a legislative aide from 1976 to 1981, he unsuccessfully ran for a seat in the Oregon House of Representatives. In 2007, he was appointed to fill the vacancy created by Mac Sumner's resignation and served until his own resignation in 2017. Gilliam was also an actor who appeared in multiple television shows.

Early life and education
Victor S. Gilliam was born on July 21, 1953 in Dover, Ohio. In 1975, he graduated from Warner Pacific University with a Bachelor of Arts degree. He then earned a Master of Education from the University of South Carolina in 1982. On May 14, 2016, he was awarded an honorary Doctor of Law degree.

Career

From 1976 to 1981, Gilliam worked as a legislative aide to United States Senator Mark Hatfield. In 1980, he criticized President Jimmy Carter's support for military registration of people aged 19 and 20 as "a quick fix, a reaction, a hysterical voice saying that something has to be done." Gilliam was an actor and a member of the Screen Actors Guild. From 1984 to 1985, he served as the director of alumni relations at Willamette University.

Oregon House of Representatives

Elections

During the 1986 elections Gilliam ran for the Republican nomination for the Oregon House of Representatives from the 31st district. During the campaign he was endorsed by the Statesman Journal editorial board. In the Republican primary he was defeated by Al Riebel.

In 1987, Gilliam announced that he would seek the Republican nomination in the 31st district, but was defeated by Gene Derfler.

In 2006, state Representative Mac Sumner announced his resignation due to his lung cancer. On December 27, Gilliam was selected to replace Sumner as representative from the 18th district by the county commissioners of Marion and Clackamas counties.

Tenure
On January 8, 2007, Gilliam was sworn into the Oregon House of Representatives and was appointed to serve on the consumer protection, and the human services and women's wellness committee during the 2007–2009 legislative session.

In 2007, Gilliam voted against legislation that would allow domestic partnerships for same-sex couples, and legislation that would prohibit discrimination against LGBT people in housing, employment, and access to public places. In 2013, he was one of five Republicans in the House of Representatives to vote in favor of allowing illegal immigrants to receive driver licenses.

Death
In 2014, Gilliam and Brian Clem participated in the Ice Bucket Challenge to raise donations for research into amyotrophic lateral sclerosis. In November 2015, he was diagnosed with amyotrophic lateral sclerosis. On January 30, 2017, Gilliam resigned from the House of Representatives due to the symptoms of the disease worsening. Gilliam died on June 17, 2020, aged 66.

Filmography

Electoral history

References

External links
 

1953 births
2020 deaths
20th-century American male actors
21st-century American male actors
21st-century American politicians
American actor-politicians
Deaths from motor neuron disease
Franklin High School (Portland, Oregon) alumni
Male actors from Oregon
Republican Party members of the Oregon House of Representatives
People from Silverton, Oregon
People from Dover, Ohio
Place of death missing
University of South Carolina alumni
Warner Pacific University alumni